Telesaar is the designation of the first German private television station. It was brought in 1954 by the European Broadcast and Television AG, which also operates the transmitter of Europe 1.

This was permitted, because until the end of 1956 the Saarland was not part of the Federal Republic of Germany and therefore not subject to German broadcast laws. Although Telesaar used the French television standard, which German televisions could not receive, the German authorities shut down the Telesaar, and the transmitter had to be adjusted in the middle of 1958. Film material of the transmissions of Telesaar are in archives of the Saarländischer Rundfunk.

References

External links

Defunct television channels in Germany
Television channels and stations established in 1953